"Nobody in His Right Mind Would've Left Her" is a song written by Dean Dillon, and recorded by American country music singer George Strait.  It was released in April 1986 as the first single from the album #7.  The song was originally recorded by Dillon, whose version peaked at number 25 on Billboard's Hot Country Singles & Tracks chart in 1980.

Content
The song tells the story of a guy that broke up with a girl. He was the one that told her he had to move on and now he’s the one crying over the loss.

Critical reception
Kevin John Coyne of Country Universe gave the song a B+ grade, calling it a "standard country weeper with a mouthful of a title." He goes on to say that Strait "is able to close the gap, which makes songs that would sound odd in another singer’s hands sound a bit surprising but still completely natural in Strait’s."

Chart positions

Dean Dillon

George Strait

Other versions
Keith Whitley recorded the song for his 1985 album L.A. to Miami; however, it wasn't released as a single.

References

1980 singles
1980 songs
1986 singles
Dean Dillon songs
Keith Whitley songs
George Strait songs
Songs written by Dean Dillon
Song recordings produced by Jimmy Bowen
RCA Records singles
MCA Records singles
Songs about parting
Songs about heartache